Inermocoelotes is a genus of funnel weavers that was first described by S. V. Ovtchinnikov in 1999.

Species
 it contains fifteen species, found only in Europe:
Inermocoelotes anoplus (Kulczyński, 1897) – Austria, Italy, Eastern Europe
Inermocoelotes brevispinus (Deltshev & Dimitrov, 1996) – Bulgaria
Inermocoelotes deltshevi (Dimitrov, 1996) – Macedonia, Bulgaria
Inermocoelotes drenskii (Deltshev, 1990) – Bulgaria
Inermocoelotes falciger (Kulczyński, 1897) – Eastern Europe
Inermocoelotes gasperinii (Simon, 1891) – Croatia, Montenegro
Inermocoelotes halanensis (Wang, Zhu & Li, 2010) – Croatia
Inermocoelotes inermis (L. Koch, 1855) (type) – Europe
Inermocoelotes jurinitschi (Drensky, 1915) – Bulgaria
Inermocoelotes karlinskii (Kulczyński, 1906) – South-eastern Europe
Inermocoelotes kulczynskii (Drensky, 1915) – Macedonia, Bulgaria
Inermocoelotes melovskii Komnenov, 2017 – Macedonia
Inermocoelotes microlepidus (de Blauwe, 1973) – Italy, Bulgaria
Inermocoelotes paramicrolepidus (Wang, Zhu & Li, 2010) – Greece
Inermocoelotes xinpingwangi (Deltshev, 2009) – Bulgaria

See also
 List of Agelenidae species

References

 
Araneomorphae genera
Spiders of Europe